Alvin Cyrrale Robertson (born July 22, 1962) is an American former professional basketball player who played in the National Basketball Association (NBA) from 1984 to 1993, and for one final season in 1995–96. Robertson holds the record for the most steals per game played, averaging 2.71 steals per game for his career and is the only player to ever have a season of 300 or more steals which he accomplished in the 1985–86 season. He is also the only guard in NBA history to have recorded a quadruple-double.

Career
Best known for his defense, the 6'4" Robertson played for ten years after being selected by the San Antonio Spurs with the seventh pick in the 1984 NBA draft out of Crowder Junior College and the University of Arkansas. After five seasons with the Spurs, He finished out his career with the Milwaukee Bucks, the Detroit Pistons and the Toronto Raptors. He also was a member of the 1984 U.S. Olympic gold-medal team.

In 1986, Robertson became the inaugural winner of the NBA Most Improved Player Award. This also marked the first of four National Basketball Association All-Star Game appearances for the guard (the others coming in 1987, 1988, and 1991). He also won the NBA Defensive Player of the Year Award in 1986, and led the league in steals in 1986, 1987 and 1991. Robertson still holds the top career steals-per-game average in the NBA, with 2.71 per contest over 779 career games.

Robertson thrice led the league in steals. In 1985–86 he averaged a league-leading 3.7 steals per game, a major factor in his earning the Defensive Player of the Year honor and being selected second-team All-NBA, one of only seven players in Spurs' history to have been selected first, second or third-team All-NBA. He was a four-time All-Star.

Robertson led the Spurs in steals four of the five seasons he was with the club, three times averaging more than three per game. Though he played only five seasons in San Antonio, he ranks third in club history in total steals, with 1,129. During his San Antonio days, he also recorded a steal in a then-NBA-record 105 consecutive games; Chris Paul surpassed it by recording a steal in 108 consecutive games from 2007 to 2008.

He is also the only non-center to record a quadruple-double, and the only player to do so with steals as the fourth category (the other three were with blocks).

On May 28, 1989, Robertson was traded by the  Spurs with Cadillac Anderson and a 1989 2nd round draft pick (Frank Kornet was later selected) to the Milwaukee Bucks for Terry Cummings and a 1990 2nd round draft pick (Tony Massenburg was later selected). He would continue to be a premier defender on the Bucks, leading the league in steal percentage, an advanced metric, each of his three full seasons. He was also voted to the 1991 all-star team, the same season he led the league in steals for the third time in his career.

During the 1993–94 season, the Detroit Pistons traded Robertson to the Denver Nuggets in exchange for Mark Macon and Marcus Liberty. However, he never saw any playing time for the Nuggets due to pre-existing back injuries.

Robertson scored the first points in Toronto Raptors' history. Ed Pinckney won the franchise's opening tip-off against the New Jersey Nets, Robertson hit a three-pointer, and the Raptors were ahead 3–0.

Personal life
Robertson is the father of Tyrell Johnson, 2008 NFL 2nd round draft choice of the Minnesota Vikings. He is also the father of Elgin Cook, a professional basketball player. His brother, Ken Robertson, played basketball for Cleveland State University.

Legal problems
Robertson has had a history of off-court problems, during and after his career. In August 1997, he pleaded no contest to four misdemeanor charges of abusing a former girlfriend and was sentenced to one year in prison. During the trial he was accused of having kicked in an apartment door while his former girlfriend and her 8-year-old daughter were inside, then taking her wallet and knocking over a television set. Robertson allegedly returned a few hours later and ripped rings off her fingers, tore a watch off her wrist, slashed furniture, damaged clothing and tried to set a fire.

He also spent a month in jail during the 1990 NBA off-season on domestic assault charges against his then-wife. Robertson was arrested again in San Antonio in January 2007, on a variety of charges, several related to domestic violence.

On February 26, 2010, Robertson was arrested and charged for the alleged sexual assault of a child, trafficking an underage child for purposes of sex and forcing a sexual performance by a child (he was later found not guilty). Authorities claim that Robertson was part of a ring that kidnapped a 14-year-old girl from San Antonio, forced her to have sex with clients and to dance at a Corpus Christi strip club in 2009. The girl escaped her alleged captors, prompting an investigation.

Alvin Robertson was cleared of all charges, and it was determined that the entire story was made up. There is still no explanation on why the accuser made this story up. Robertson was found not guilty of all charges on November 30, 2015.

In August 2018, Robertson was arrested in San Antonio on an outstanding warrant for violating a protective order.

NBA career statistics

Regular season

|-
| style="text-align:left;"|
| style="text-align:left;"|San Antonio
| 79 || 9 || 21.3 || .498 || .364 || .734 || 3.4 || 3.5 || 1.6 || 0.3 || 9.2
|-
| style="text-align:left;"|
| style="text-align:left;"|San Antonio
| 82 || 82 || 35.1 || .514 || .276 || .795 || 6.3 || 5.5 || style="background:#E0CEF2;"|3.7 || 0.5 || 17.0
|-
| style="text-align:left;"|
| style="text-align:left;"|San Antonio
| 81 || 78 || 33.3 || .466 || .271 || .753 || 6.3 || 5.2 || style="background:#CFECEC;"|3.2* || 0.4 || 17.7
|-
| style="text-align:left;"|
| style="text-align:left;"|San Antonio
| 82 || 82 || 36.3 || .465 || .284 || .748 || 6.1 || 6.8 || 3.0 || 0.8 || 19.6
|-
| style="text-align:left;"|
| style="text-align:left;"|San Antonio
| 65 || 65 || 35.2 || .483 || .200 || .723 || 5.9 || 6.0 || 3.0 || 0.6 || 17.3
|-
| style="text-align:left;"|
| style="text-align:left;"|Milwaukee
| 81 || 81 || 32.1 || .503 || .154 || .741 || 6.9 || 5.5 || 2.6 || 0.2 || 14.2
|-
| style="text-align:left;"|
| style="text-align:left;"|Milwaukee
| 81 || 81 || 32.1 || .485 || .365 || .757 || 5.7 || 5.5 || style="background:#CFECEC;"|3.0* || 0.2 || 13.6
|-
| style="text-align:left;"|
| style="text-align:left;"|Milwaukee
| 82 || 79 || 30.0 || .430 || .319 || .763 || 4.3 || 4.4 || 2.6 || 0.4 || 12.3
|-
| style="text-align:left;"|
| style="text-align:left;"|Milwaukee
| 39 || 32 || 27.3 || .479 || .309 || .629 || 3.5 || 4.0 || 2.3 || 0.2 || 8.7
|-
| style="text-align:left;"|
| style="text-align:left;"|Detroit
| 30 || 22 || 31.4 || .434 || .343 || .690 || 4.4 || 3.6 || 2.2 || 0.3 || 9.3
|-
| style="text-align:left;"|
| style="text-align:left;"|Toronto
| 77 || 69 || 32.2 || .470 || .272 || .677 || 4.4 || 4.2 || 2.2 || 0.5 || 9.3
|- class="sortbottom"
| style="text-align:center;" colspan="2"|Career
| 779 || 680 || 31.7 || .477 || .295 || .743 || 5.2 || 5.0 || bgcolor="EOCEF2" |  2.7  || 0.4 || 14.0
|- class="sortbottom"
| style="text-align:center;" colspan="2"|All-Star
| 4 || 2 || 15.0 || .389 || — || 1.000 || 3.3 || 1.8 || 0.5 || — || 4.5

Playoffs

|-
| style="text-align:left;"|1986
| style="text-align:left;"|San Antonio
| 3 || 3 || 32.7 || .276 || — || .846 || 4.7 || 6.3 || 2.3 || 0.3 || 9.0
|-
| style="text-align:left;"|1988
| style="text-align:left;"|San Antonio
| 3 || 3 || 39.7 || .566 || .429 || .778 || 4.7 || 9.3 || |4.0 || 0.3 || 23.3
|-
| style="text-align:left;"|1990
| style="text-align:left;"|Milwaukee
| 4 || 4 || 38.8 || .522 || .000 || .706 || 5.8 || 4.8 || 2.3 || 0.0 || 23.5
|-
| style="text-align:left;"|1991
| style="text-align:left;"|Milwaukee
| 3 || 3 || 39.3 || .592 || .333 || .769 || 6.0 || 5.0 || 2.7 || 0.0 || 23.7
|- class="sortbottom"
| style="text-align:center;" colspan="2"|Career
| 13 || 13 || 37.7 || .515 || .353 || .754 || 5.3 || 6.2 || 2.8 || 0.2 || 20.2

Awards and Achievements

 1st place all-time for steals in a single season with 301.
 1st place all-time in games with at least 5 steals with 142.
 1st place all-time in games with at least 7 steals with 32.
 1st place all-time in games with at least 9 steals with 4.
 1st place all-time in games with at least 10 steals with 4.
 Only player in NBA history to record at least 300 steals in a single season.
 One of four players in NBA history to record a quadruple double.
 Includes David Robinson, Nate Thurmond, and Hakeem Olajuwon.
 Only player in NBA history to record a quadruple double as a guard.

See also

 List of National Basketball Association career steals leaders
 List of National Basketball Association players with most steals in a game

References

External links
 

1962 births
Living people
African-American basketball players
All-American college men's basketball players
American expatriate basketball people in Canada
American men's basketball players
American people convicted of assault
Arkansas Razorbacks men's basketball players
Basketball players at the 1984 Summer Olympics
Basketball players from Ohio
Crowder College alumni
Detroit Pistons players
Florida Beachdogs players
Junior college men's basketball players in the United States
Medalists at the 1984 Summer Olympics
Milwaukee Bucks players
National Basketball Association All-Stars
Olympic gold medalists for the United States in basketball
People from Barberton, Ohio
San Antonio Spurs draft picks
San Antonio Spurs players
Shooting guards
Toronto Raptors players
United States men's national basketball team players
21st-century African-American people
20th-century African-American sportspeople